François Poulletier de la Salle (30 September 1719 in Lyon – 20 March 1788 in Paris) was a French doctor and chemist. In about 1758, he isolated for the first time the crystals from cholesterol. As his work was never published, attribution and the dating are known only roughly, but they were quoted by his collaborators, in particular Pierre-Joseph Macquer and Felix Vicq-d'Azyr.

References

1719 births
1788 deaths
18th-century French chemists
Scientists from Lyon